Hurdman may refer to:
Arthur Hurdman, English footballer
George Charles Hurdman (born 1870), Ontario lumber merchant and political figure
Hurdman Station (OC Transpo), station on Ottawa's transitway
William H. Hurdman (born 1818), Canadian entrepreneur and community leader